André Filipe Pereira Fontes (born 27 May 1985 in Tábua, Coimbra District) is a Portuguese professional footballer who plays for F.C. Oliveira do Hospital as a midfielder.

References

External links

1985 births
Living people
People from Tábua
Sportspeople from Coimbra District
Portuguese footballers
Association football midfielders
Primeira Liga players
Liga Portugal 2 players
Segunda Divisão players
F.C. Oliveira do Hospital players
G.D. Tourizense players
Associação Académica de Coimbra – O.A.F. players
C.D. Feirense players
Associação Naval 1º de Maio players
F.C. Penafiel players
Moreirense F.C. players
G.D. Chaves players
Gil Vicente F.C. players
U.D. Leiria players
Louletano D.C. players